The 1919–20 National Challenge Cup was the annual open cup held by the United States Football Association now known as the Lamar Hunt U.S. Open Cup. This edition featured 99 teams in two divisions. The western division had 41 teams in six districts while the eastern division had 58 teams also divided into six districts. The draw for the first round took place on October 13, 1919, in New York.

Bracket
Home teams listed on top of bracket

(*): replay after tied match
w/o: walkover/forfeit victory awarded

Semifinal

Final

See also
1920 American Cup

References
USOpenCup.com 

U.S. Open Cup
Nat